Ihar Hamlyak (born 20 May 1988) is a Belarusian former professional footballer.

References

External links
 Player Profile at footballtop.com
 
 

1988 births
Living people
Belarusian footballers
Association football goalkeepers
FC Dinamo Minsk players
FC Shakhtyor Soligorsk players
FC Baranovichi players
FC Naftan Novopolotsk players
FC Granit Mikashevichi players
FC Gorodeya players